"The Stake Out" is the second episode of the first season of the NBC comedy Seinfeld.

It aired as the second episode of the season on May 31, 1990. The episode was written by Jerry Seinfeld and Larry David and directed by Tom Cherones. The narrative features Jerry Seinfeld agreeing to attend a birthday party with his ex-girlfriend Elaine Benes. During the party, Jerry tries to flirt with another woman, but fails to learn anything about her except her place of work. Jerry is reluctant to ask Elaine for the woman's number because he does not talk to her about other women. Jerry's father, Morty, suggests that he "stake out" the woman's workplace and pretend to meet her accidentally, which Jerry does. "The Stake Out" is the first episode to feature Jerry's parents. The episode was nominated for a Writers Guild Award in 1991.

Plot
Jerry and Elaine have just ended their relationship, but have chosen to remain friends. Elaine invites Jerry to a birthday party; he agrees to go on the condition that she accompanies him to a wedding that he and his parents have been invited to. At the party, Jerry meets an attractive woman named Vanessa. He wants to flirt with her, but is uncomfortable doing so in Elaine's presence. The woman leaves with another man before Jerry finds out her name; however, he learns that she works at a law firm called "Sagman, Bennett, Robbins, Oppenheim and Taft". During the party, Elaine tries to tell Jerry about a dream she had, which featured him. Jerry tries to end the conversation but this results in an argument after the party is over.

Back at his apartment, Jerry's parents, Morty and Helen, sleep over, with Jerry sleeping in Kramer's apartment. He talks about the party and claims that he cannot get the phone number of the woman from Elaine because he does not talk about other women with her; additionally, she is still angry with him. Morty suggests that Jerry "stake out" the woman by waiting outside her office, an idea which Jerry likes. The following day, Jerry and George Costanza perform the stake out, pretending that they are coming to see someone else in the building named "Art Corvelay", but under pressure, George insists that they make it "Art Vandelay". They meet the woman, who says the man she left the party with was her cousin. The two then decide to go out on a date.

Later that night, Jerry finds out from his mother that Elaine knows about the stake out. On the day of the wedding, Elaine tells Jerry that the reason that she was angry was because it was the first time she saw him flirt with another woman. They decide that they have to be able to talk more about their relationships if they wish to remain friends. Elaine then reveals that she has recently met a man using a stake out.

Production
"The Stake Out" is based on a real life incident in which David was with a woman that he had dated previously named Monica Yates (daughter of author Richard Yates). They then went to a restaurant and David met another woman. However, he could not flirt as much as he wanted due to the presence of Yates. David did find out the name of the building where she worked at and staked her out. The names of the people in the title of the law firm are friends Larry David made at college.

This episode prompted running gags that were used in later episodes. These were the importer-exporter, George's ambitions of becoming an architect and Art Vandelay. The character of Vanessa (named after a woman David once went out with) also reappears in a later episode from the first season, "The Stock Tip".

"The Stake Out" is the first episode to mention the past relationship between Jerry and Elaine. Although it was the third episode to be filmed (after "The Seinfeld Chronicles" and "Male Unbonding"), it was the second episode to be broadcast. The episode order was changed because "The Stake Out" provided more background information about Elaine and her relationship with Jerry. Julia Louis-Dreyfus commented that she liked the script for the episode because it made the character seem human. She also commented on the fact that it was racy due to the mention of a pornographic film.

The opening scene caused some problems because it featured a woman walking off the set and taking one step down to get off it. Gleen Forbes, the set designer, thought that this made the show look cheap. The scene in which Jerry and Elaine are in a taxi was filmed in a studio using a black background and moving a fake taxi, due to budget restraints, in a method known as "Poor Man's Process."

This is the first episode to feature Jerry's parents. Only one casting session was performed to find the actors for the roles. Philip Sterling was originally cast to play the role of Morty Seinfeld, but was replaced with Phil Bruns. Bruns was then replaced as well because Seinfeld and David wanted the character to be harsher. As a result, the role was recast and given to Barney Martin — who had no idea that another actor had already established the part. In this episode Kramer greets Morty by name. Unlike later episodes featuring recast characters, this episode featuring Phil Bruns' scenes were not re-filmed for syndication with Barney Martin substituting for Bruns, as the characters had aged too much in the show for that to be an option.

Reception
When "The Stake Out" was first broadcast on May 31, 1990, the episode attracted a Nielsen rating of 16.2/24, meaning that 16.2% of American households watched the episode, and that 24% of all televisions in use at the time were tuned into it. When the episode was first repeated, on December 2, 1992, a special introductory film was made featuring Louis-Dreyfus and Seinfeld, in which they stated that this episode was the first one they did together. Strictly speaking, though, it was just the first episode broadcast — in terms of production order, "Male Unbonding" was the first episode in which the two characters both appeared.

The episode was nominated for a Writers Guild Award in 1991. Holly E. Ordway for DVD Talk Review commented positively on not just this episode, but the whole of the first season, saying, "What's not to like about an episode like 'The Stakeout,' in which (among other things) we are witness to the invention of George's alter ego, Art Vandelay (and his import/export business)?" Mary Kay Shilling and Mike Flaherty of Entertainment Weekly also liked the episode but had some doubts, saying it was, "A painfully realistic take on the lovers-to-friends transition that should have been more comically fruitful."

However, some reviews of the episode were critical, both now and at the time. When first broadcast, Matt Roush from USA Today wrote: "Lacking much in the way of attitude, the show seems obsolete and irrelevant. What it boils down to is that Seinfeld is a mayonnaise clown in the world that requires a little horseradish."

Colin Jacobson for DVD Movie Guide criticized the writing, saying, "the show's rather bland. It provides the occasional chuckle, but the characters aren't formed yet, and that makes the program ring false. The ending reconciliation between Jerry and Elaine causes particular problems; it doesn't turn sappy, but it comes too close for Seinfeld."

References

External links 
 

Seinfeld (season 1) episodes
1990 American television episodes
Television episodes written by Larry David
Television episodes written by Jerry Seinfeld